Thomas Ware (16 October 1885 – 1 May 1915) was an English professional footballer who played in the Football League for Bristol City as a goalkeeper.

Personal life 
Prior to being bought out of the British Army to become a professional footballer, Ware served as a musician in the Cameronians (Scottish Rifles). Though discharged, he remained on the reserve list. He combined his football career with a factory job in Broadmead. Ware re-enlisted in the army upon the outbreak of the First World War in 1914 and enlisted as a gunner in the Royal Field Artillery. He was wounded in action during the Second Battle of Ypres and died of wounds at 84th Field Ambulance in Poperinge on 1 May 1915. He was buried in Poperinge Old Military Cemetery.

References

1915 deaths
Footballers from Bristol
English footballers
English Football League players
Association football goalkeepers
British Army soldiers
British Army personnel of World War I
Cameronians soldiers
British military personnel killed in World War I
Royal Field Artillery soldiers
Bristol City F.C. players
1885 births